Owen Andrew Burke (25 March 1949 – 5 April 2009) was a Barbadian sailor. He competed in the Finn event at the 1992 Summer Olympics.

References

External links
 

1949 births
2009 deaths
Barbadian male sailors (sport)
Olympic sailors of Barbados
Sailors at the 1992 Summer Olympics – Finn
Sportspeople from Bridgetown